Sportsman, real name Per Magnusson, is an artist, songwriter and previous singer in the Swedish band The Sonnets. He has released one single and one EP on the British record label Best Fit Recordings. On 2 June 2017 Sportsman released his debut album Neverland, produced by the Swedish producer Johan Cederberg (HNNY). Sportsman's musical style is often described as R&B-pop.

Biography 

In January 2013 Sportsman released his debut single Rally, a duet with Linnea Jönsson, formerly the singer in Those Dancing Days. In November 2013 Sportsman released the EP Usher, produced by Johan Cederberg (HNNY) and Victor Holmberg (1987). It was followed by Begin Again, a cover of the Taylor Swift song with the same name. In March 2017 Sportsman announced his debut album Neverland with the single Running On A Beach.

Discography

Albums

Extended plays

Singles

References

External links 

 Official website
 "In demand: Sportsman." Gigwise. 25 March 2013.
 "Sportsman om slöjan." Bon. 2 January 2014.  
 "Premiär: Sportsman - "White Shark". Musikguiden i P3. 16 May 2017. 
 "Sportsman Channels Underwater Vibes On 'White Shark'". Clash. 18 May 2017.

Swedish artists
Swedish songwriters